The Al McGuire Center is a 3,700-seat arena in Milwaukee, Wisconsin, which houses the women's volleyball and basketball teams at Marquette University. It also serves as a practice facility for the men's basketball team. It was opened in 2004, replacing the venerable Marquette Gymnasium. The complex is a $31 million athletic facility named for Al McGuire, the coach who led the men's basketball team to an NCAA championship, an NIT title, and 295 victories in 13 seasons. The McGuire Center offers practice facilities for men's and women's basketball, including strength and conditioning and sports medicine facilities, an academic center for student athletes, and a Marquette Athletics Hall of Fame.

See also
 List of NCAA Division I basketball arenas

References

College basketball venues in the United States
College volleyball venues in the United States
Marquette Golden Eagles basketball venues
Sports venues in Milwaukee
Basketball venues in Wisconsin
2004 establishments in Wisconsin
Sports venues completed in 2004